The Mossi are a Gur ethnic group native to modern Burkina Faso, primarily the Volta River basin. The Mossi are the largest ethnic group in Burkina Faso, constituting 52% of the population, or about 11.1 million people. The other 48% of Burkina Faso's population is composed of more than 60 ethnic groups, mainly the Gurunsi, Senufo, Lobi, Bobo and Fulani. The Mossi speak the Mòoré language.

History
The Mossi people originated in Burkina Faso, although significant numbers of Mossi live in neighboring countries, including Benin, Côte d'Ivoire, Ghana, Mali, and Togo. In 2022, the estimated population of Burkina Faso was 20M+, over 11M of which are Mossi. Another 2 million Mossi live in Côte d'Ivoire.

Origins
According to oral tradition, the Mossi come from the marriage of a Dagomba princess, Yennenga, and Mandé hunter.

Yennenga was a warrior princess, daughter of a Dagbon king, Naa Gbewaa, of present-day northern Ghana. Gbewaa's tomb is located in Pusiga in the Upper East Region of Ghana.The story has it that while exploring her kingdom on horseback, she lost her way and was rescued by Rialé, a solitary Mandé hunter. They got married and gave birth to a son, Ouedraogo, who is recognised as the father of Mossi people.

Mossi Empire

Though Mossi records exist, primarily written using the Ajami script, the Mossi people's history has largely been kept by oral tradition. This means it is impossible to assign precise origin dates.  Nevertheless, historians assign the beginning of their existence as a state to the 11th century. The Mossi were able to conquer a vast amounts of territory thanks to their mastering of the horse, created a prosperous empire, and kept peace in the region until the Mossi Kingdoms were conquered by the French. The expansion of the Mossi empire was stopped in the 19th century with the initiation of intensive colonisation by the French.

Colonial era

French rule affected Mossi society and weakened the power of the Mossi emperor, the Mogho Naaba. Despite colonization, the Mogho Naaba was given some authority over the Mossi during the French colonial period. He is consulted today for crucial decisions, especially those affecting the destiny of society. Two great events have affected the status of the Mogho Naaba during colonization:

 During the initial phase of the French invasion, he retired to the Mamprusi kingdom with which the Mossi have always kept brotherly relations.
 In 1896, the Mogho Naaba accepted the French protectorate.

The Mossi and several other peoples played a significant role in France's military during World War II. They constituted part of the corps in the military troops of French West Africa, known in French as the Tirailleurs Sénégalais.

Organization of Mossi society
The Mossi people have organised their society in an original hierarchic process in which family and state are the key elements. The Mossi people are very heterogeneous. When horsemen invaded from the south they created a political or ruling class, called Nakomse (sing. Nakoambga), and a spiritual class called Tengabisi. All chiefs come from the ruling class. The Tengabisi include Saya (smiths), Nyonyose (farmers), Yarse (weavers and merchants), and others.

The origins of the Nyonyose are diverse: In the north their ancestors were Dogon and Kurumba, in the southwest their ancestors were Lela, Nuna, Sisala and others, and in the far east they were Gurmantche. These people were united into a new ethnicity called Mossi in about 1500.

It is a mistake to describe a "Nyonyosé tribe" or the "art of the Nyonyosé" because the Nyonyose do not exist outside Mossi society. All Nyonyosé are Mossi. At the same time, it is a mistake to assume that all segments of Mossi society are culturally identical, for the differences between the Nakomsé and the Tengabisi are striking; only the Tengabisi use masks, and only the Nakomsé use figures in the context of political celebrations. The Nakomse are the political class, and the Tengabisi are the spiritual class.

Mogho Naaba and the Nakomse

The highest position in Mossi society is that of the Mogho Naaba, who is given executive power. The Mogho Naaba's role is to rule the entire population and to protect the kingdom. Today, he lives in Ouagadougou, the historical capital of the Mossi Empire and present capital of Burkina Faso. Though the political dynamic of the country has changed, the Mogho Naaba is recognised by his people and has substantial authority.

Second to the Mogho Naaba come the nobles, Nakomse (“people of power”; sing. Nakoambga), who all are from the family of the Mogho Naaba, whether they be brothers, sisters, cousins, or otherwise. All dignitaries come from the Mogho Naaba's family. The Nakomse are often assigned territories in the kingdom as governorships and rule in the name of the Mogho Naaba. As in the past, the Mogho Naaba needs the support of the “ancient ones”, his Nyon-nyonse (or gnon-gnon-sse) subjects to fully exercise his power. The Nyon-nyonse are the peoples who lived in Mossi-controlled regions before the Mossi.

Mossi society is divided vertically into two major segments: the descendants of the horsemen who conquered the peoples on the Mossi plateau are called the Nakomse, and all Mossi Napa's (kings) come exclusively from the Nakomse class. These people use figures as political art to validate their rule over the peoples they conquered. The descendants of the ancient farming peoples who had occupied the land from the beginning of time and who, by right of first occupation, were and are the owners of the land are called the Tengabisi (“people of the earth”). These Tengabisi can be further divided into groups of smiths (Saya), groups of traders (Yarse) and, most important, groups of farmers (Nyonyose). Generally the smiths and the traders do not use masks, but the Nyonyose are the principal makers and users of masks in Mossi society.

Craftsmen and ordinary citizens

They constitute the larger part of the population and are all subjects of the emperor. These two groups are generally fused but have internal subdivisions, each one having its own ruling family; they perform ceremonies and other important events. Mossi people often identify with groups; hence, at all levels, there is a hierarchy in Mossi society. In everyday life, the family hierarchy is most important, and family is often directly associated with the notion of hierarchy for the Mossi.

'Mogonaba' was what Leo Frobenius was told was the appropriate term for the emperor of Mossi at Wagadugu when he visited the country in 1904–6. His is one of the few disinterested reports as he was an anthropologist and not a missionary, representative of a European company, or military. He describes a court much like a European one (he may have an anti-aristocratic bias) with nobles in intrigues over commerce, power and industry. This report alone caused disbelief in Europe as no European source had ever considered Africans to be socially like Europeans. The lack of racism in Frobenius' report and his discovery of an industrious people and what some would describe as a glorious past interested W.E.B. Du Bois in Frobenius' other writings on Africa. Rudolf Blind's translation in English of the Voice of Africa, published by Hutchinson & Co., produced some racist comments he thought necessary to conform with English sensitivities — otherwise he believed no Englishman would consider the book realistic.

An important contribution was made in the 1960s by the historian Elliott P. Skinner, who wrote at length about the sophistication of Mossi political systems in The Mossi of the Upper Volta: The Political Development of a Sudanese People. This was at a time when many African countries were gaining independence, and Skinner strongly made the point that African peoples were very clearly qualified to govern themselves.

Language and cultural values
Group identity and values within the Mossi and contrasted against other ethnic groups are tied first and foremost to language.

Mossi language

The Mossi speak the Mooré language, of the Western Oti-Volta group of languages, northwestern sub-group. It is spoken in Burkina Faso, Ghana, and Ivory Coast. This language group is part of a larger grouping, Gur languages belonging to the Niger–Congo family. In the language there are a few dialects based mainly on region. For example, there is a dialect spoken in Yatenga (Ouahigouya), another distinct dialect in the northern region, a third in the southeast in Koupela, different from a fourth dialect in the same region called Tenkodogo. Despite these regional differences, the dialects are mutually intelligible.

Cultural values
According to the explanations of Marie Tapsoba, the former Cultural Counsellor at Burkina Embassy in Senegal and Mossi herself, Mossi culture can be divided into four main values characteristic of the ethnic group.

Attitude towards ancestors
Ancestors are believed to have reached a better world from which they can influence life on earth. They can help or punish their descendants depending on their behavior. Ancestors are also the judges that have the power to allow a descendant to enter the "pantheon of the ancestors". If an ancestor chooses to deny entrance, the soul of the disavowed one is condemned to run at random for all eternity. Because of these beliefs, Mossi swear by their ancestors or by the land; when they do so (which only occurs in extreme situations), it is more than symbolic — it is a call to imminent justice.

Land
Land is related to the ancestors, being a path by which one can access the ancestors. Even today, this notion gives a unique value to land in Mossi thought. Land is considered to be much more than simple dust and has a spiritual dimension to it. A Mossi's life depends on his/her land, and it is essential for the family settlement.

Family
Family is an essential cultural element of the Mossi, who hold collectivism in high regard. Individualism does not exist in traditional Mossi culture: one's actions and behaviors are always taken to be characteristics of one's family. They must always ask an elder in order to do something. As a result, all are expected to act in their family's name; thus, the family is the smallest entity in the Mossi society. Heritage is patrilineal, passed down from a father to his sons. However, when a man has no sons, women can inherit from their husbands and even from their father.

Hierarchy
Hierarchy is a fundamental concept for the Mossi and pervasive in their culture. The family is organised like a kingdom with its king — the husband and father, his advisor — the wife, and the people — the children. Aunts and uncles play a role by helping in the education and raising of children.

Traditional and cultural holidays and events

Ceremonies and celebrations pace the life of Mossi people, with each celebration having its particulars. Through them the community expresses joy or suffering, or simply fulfills duties to the memory of the ancestors.

Mogho Naaba court
The Friday Mogho Naaba court ceremony derives from an event when the Moro Naba's sister fled north to the land of Yadega, the kingdom called Yatenga. As she fled north, she carried all of the amulets of power, or nam, with her. The Moro Naba had to decide whether to follow her and retrieve his sacred power objects or to remain behind to rule over his people. Three times he left his palace to mount a white horse, and three times he returned to the palace. In the end he did not pursue his sister, and to this day the kings of Yatenga claim that they hold the power of Mossi rule.

The political segment of Mossi society, the Nakomse (sing. Nakoambga), use art to validate their rule. Bridles, saddles, stirrups and other objects associated with the horse are very important. In addition, Mossi chiefs use carved wooden figures to represent their royal ancestors. These figures are displayed each year at royal festivals called na possum, when the heads of each household in the community reaffirm their allegiance and loyalty to the chief.

Mossi Masks

The Nyonyose (the ancient farmers and spiritual segment of Mossi society) use masks in their religious observances and rituals. The Nakomse (chief class) do not use masks. Masks in initiations and funerals is typical of all the Voltaic or Gur-speaking peoples, including the Nyonyose, Lela, Winiama, Nouna, Bwaba, and Dogon. Masks appear at burials to observe on behalf of the ancestors that proper procedures are carried out. They appear at funeral or memorial services held at regular intervals over the few years after an elder has died. Masks attend to honor the deceased and to verify that the spirit of the deceased merits admission into the world of ancestors. Without a proper funeral, the spirit remains near the home and causes trouble for his/her descendants.

Masks are carved of the wood of the Ceiba pentandra, the faux kapokier. They are carved in three major styles that correspond to the styles of the ancient people who were conquered in 1500 by the invading Nakomse and integrated into a new Mossi society:

 In the north masks are vertical planks with a round concave or convex face. 
 In the southwest masks represent animals such as antelope, bush buffalo, and strange creatures, and are painted red, white and black.
 In the east, around Boulsa, masks have tall posts above the face to which fiber is attached.

Female masks have two pairs of round mirrors for eyes; small masks, representing Yali ("the child") have two vertical horns. All Nyonyose masks are worn with thick costumes made of the fiber of the wild hemp, Hibiscus cannabinus. In the old days only the northern Nyonyose in Yatenga and Kaya, and the eastern people around Boulsa allowed their masks to be photographed. The people in the southwest forbade photography because it did not conform to the yaaba soore, the path of the ancestors.

Mask characters include Balinga, the Fulani woman; katre, the hyena; nyaka, the small antelope; Wan pelega, the large antelope, and many others. Masks from all three areas appear at annual public festivals such as International Art & Craft Fair (Salon international de l’Artisanat de Ouagadougou or SIAO), Week of the Culture, and the Atypical Nights of Koudougou (Les Nuits Atypiques de Koudougou). Each Nyonyose family has its own mask, and they are charged with protecting the masks to this day. Masks are very sacred and are a link to the spirits of ancestors and of nature.

Notable Mossi people
Dez Altino, Burkinabè musician
Laurent Bado, Burkinabè politician
Narcisse Bambara, Burkinabè footballer
Habib Bamogo, Burkinabè footballer
Jean Claude Bamogo, Burkinabè musician
Aristide Bancé, Burkinabè footballer
Ibrahim Bancé, Burkinabè footballer
Hassane Bandé, Burkinabè footballer 
 Hamed Belem
Djibril Bassolé, Burkinabe politician
Blaise Bassoleth, Burkinabe politician
Pingdwinde Beleme, Burkinabè footballer
Sana Bob, Burkinabè musician
Innocent Bologo, Burkinabè sprinter
Juliette Bonkoungou, Burkinabè ambassador
Bassirou Compaoré, Burkinabè footballer
Blaise Compaoré, former President of Burkina Faso from 1987 to 2014
Issouf Compaoré, Burkinabè musician
Raïssa Compaore, Burkinabè journalist
Simon Compaoré, Burkinabè politician
Simporé Simone Compaoré, Burkinabè playwright
Aminata Sana Congo, Burkinabè politician
Ernest Aboubacar Congo, Burkinabè footballer
Christophe Joseph Marie Dabiré, Burkinabè politician
Moumouni Dagano, Burkinabè footballer
Noellie Marie bèatri Damiba, Burkinabè journalist
Paul-Henri Sandaogo Damiba, Current président of Burkina Faso 
Issoufou Dayo, Burkinabe footballer
Zéphirin Diabré, Burkinabè politician
Gilbert Diendéré, Burkinabè military officer
Moumouni Fabré, Burkinabè politician
Floby, Burkinabè musician
Adama Guira, Burkinabè footballer
Frédéric Guirma, Burkinabè diplomat
Monique Ilboudo, Burkinabè author
Patrick Ilboudo, Burkinabè writer
Pierre Claver Ilboudo, Burkinabè writer
Aline Koala Kaboré, Burkinabè diplomat
Charles Kaboré, Burkinabè footballer
Gaston Kaboré, Burkinabè film director
Idrissa Kabore, Burkinabè boxer
Issa Kaboré, Burkinabè footballer
Karim Kaboré, Burkinabè cyclist
Mohamed Kaboré, Burkinabè footballer
Omar Kaboré, Burkinabè footballer
Pierre Landry Kaboré, Burkinabè footballer
Rahiza Kaboré, Bukinabè designer
Roch Marc Christian Kaboré, former President of Burkina Faso
Salimata Kaboré, Burkinabè painter
Zinda Kaboré, Burkinabè politician
Michel Kafando, former President of Burkina Faso
Bèbè Kambou, Burkinabè footballer
Ismaël Karambiri, Burkinabè footballer
Kayawoto, Burkinabè musician
Marthe Koala, Burkinabè athlete
Eddie Komboïgo, Burkinabè politician
Arzouma Aime Kompaoré, Burkinabè screenwriter
Nathanio Kompaoré, Burkinabè footballer
Cheick Kongo, French mixed martial artist
Brahima Korbeogo, Burkinabè footballer
Jean-Baptiste Kiéthéga, Burkinabè archeologist
Djakaridja Koné, Burkinabè footballer
Ismaël Koudou, Burkinabè footballer
Imilo Lechanceux, Ivorian-Burkinabè musician 
Hubert Maga, former President of Benin
Frère Malkhom, Burkinabè musician
Kamou Malo, Burkinabè football coach
Patrick Malo, Burkinabè footballer
Alif Naaba, Burkinabè musician
Mogho Naaba, King of the Mossi people
Supreme Nabiga, Burkinabè musician
Préjuce Nakoulma, Burkinabè footballer
Elisabeth Nikiema, Burkinabè swimmer
Jacqueline Marie Zaba Nikiéma, Burkinabè diplomat
Mamounata Nikiéma, Burkinabè producer
Suzy Henrique Nikiéma, Burkinabè writer
Boubacar Nimi, Burkinabè footballer
Xavier Niodogo, Burkinabè diplomat
Kollin Noaga, Burkinabè novelist
Salif Nogo, Burkinabè footballer
Ablassé Ouedraogo, Burkinabè economist
Adama Ouedraogo, Burkinabè swimmer
Adama Ouédraogo, Burkinabè actor
Alassane Ouédraogo, Burkinabè footballer
Alice Ouédraogo, Burkinabè lawyer
Ambroise Ouédraogo, Burkinabè Roman Catholic Archbishop of Maradi
Angèle Bassolé-Ouédraogo, Canadian poet
Angelika Ouedraogo, Burkinabè swimmer
Antoinette Ouédraogo, Burkinabè lawyer
Assita Ouédraogo, Burkinabè actress
 Bassirou Ouédraogo
Bachir Ismaël Ouédraogo, Burkinabè politician
Claire Ouedraogo, Burkinabè nun and activist
Dim-Dolobsom Ouédraogo, Burkinabè intellectual
Élodie Ouédraogo, Belgian sprinter
Fulgence Ouedraogo, French rugby union player
Gérard Kango Ouédraogo, Burkinabè statesman
Gilbert Noël Ouédraogo, Burkinabè politician
Hamado Ouedraogo, Burkinabè footballer
Idrissa Ouédraogo, Burkinabè filmmaker
Ismahila Ouédraogo, Burkinabè footballer
Issa Ouédraogo, Burkinabè javelin thrower
Issiaka Ouédraogo, Burkinabè footballer
Jean-Baptiste Ouédraogo, former president of Burkina Faso
Jean-Bernard Ouédraogo, Burkinabe sociologist
Joseph Ouédraogo, Burkinabè politician
Joséphine Ouédraogo, Burkinabè sociologist
Kadré Désiré Ouédraogo, former Prime Minister of Burkina Faso
Kassoum Ouédraogo, former Burkinabè footballer
Louckmane Ouédraogo, Burkinabè footballer
Mahamadou Lamine Ouédraogo, Burkinabè author
Mamadou Ouedraogo, Burkinabè swimmer
Mamadou Ouédraogo, Burkinabè politician
Marie Françoise Ouedraogo, Burkinabè mathematician
Noufou Ouédraogo, Burkinabè actor
Ouamdégré Ouedraogo, Burkinabè playwright
Paul Yemboaro Ouédraogo, Burkinabè archbishop
Peggy Ouedraogo, Burkinabè journalist
Philippe Ouédraogo, Burkinabè politician
Philippe Ouédraogo, Burkinabè cardinal
Rabaki Jérémie Ouédraogo, Burkinabè cyclist
Ram Ouédraogo, Burkinabè politician
Rasmané Ouédraogo Burkinabè cyclist
Rasmané Ouédraogo,  Burkinabè actor
Robert Ouédraogo, Burkinabè priest and musician
Roukiata Ouedraogo, Burkinabè playwright
Samuel Ouedraogo, Burkinabè basketball player
Sibidou Ouédraogo, Burkinabè actor
Tahirou Tasséré Ouédraogo, Burkinabè film director
Youssouf Ouédraogo, former Prime Minister of Burkina Faso
Hanatou Ouelogo, Burkinabè judoka
Titinga Frédéric Pacéré, Burkinabè writer
Saïdou Panandétiguiri, Burkinabè footballer
Pargui Emile Paré, Burkinabè politician
Issouf Paro, Burkinabè footballer
Clément Pitroipa, Burkinabè footballer
Jonathan Pitroipa, Burkinabè footballer
Romaric Pitroipa, Burkinabè footballer
Stéphane Pognongo, Burkinabè footballer
Florent Rouamba, Burkinabè footballer
Alimata Salembèré, Burkinabè film administrator
bènéwendé Stanislas Sankara, Burkinabè politician
Odile Sankara, Burkinabè actress
Robert Sankara, Burkinabè footballer
Thomas Sankara, former President of Burkina Faso from 1983 to 1987
Boubacar Sanogo, Ivorian footballer
Sékou Sanogo, Ivorian footballer
Sékou Sanogo, Ivorian politician
 Yaya Sanogo, Ivorian Footballer
Zakaria Sanogo, Burkinabè footballer
Aboubacar Sawadogo, Burkinabè footballer
Bienvenu Sawadogo, Burkinabè sprinter
Clément Sawadogo, Burkinabè politician
Etienne Sawadogo, Burkinabè novelist
Faysal Sawadogo, Burkinabè athlete
Habibou Sawadogo, Burkinabè musician
Isaka Sawadogo, Burkinabè actor
Salimata Sawadogo Burkinabè ambassador
Samira Sawadogo, Burkinabè actress
Siméon Sawadogo, Burkinabè politician
Souleymane Sawadogo, Burkinabè footballer
Tindwende Sawadogo, Burkinabè swimmer
Yacouba Sawadogo, pioneer of 'zai' farming technique and winner of numerous international environmental awards
Moussa Savadogo, Malian sprinter
Moussa Savadogo, Burkinabè playwright
Laurent Sedego, Burkinabè politician
Saran Sérémé, Burkinabè politician
Saïdou Simporé, Burkinabè footballer
Salimata Simporé, Burkinabè footballer
Sofiano, Burkinabè musician
Joey le Soldat, Burkinabè musician
Issouf Sosso, Burkinabè footballer
Abdoul Tapsoba, Burkinabè footballer
Edmond Tapsoba, Burkinabè footballer
Irène Tassembèdo, Burkinabè dancer
Soumaila Tassembedo, Burkinabè footballer
Bamos Théo, Burkinabè musician
Issaka Thiombiano, Burkinabè cinematographer
Ilias Tiendrébèogo, Burkinabè footballer
Irène Tiendrébèogo, Burkinabè athlete
Hippolyte Wangrawa, Burkinabè actor
Wendy, Burkinabè musician
Steeve Yago, Burkinabè footballer
Blaise Yaméogo, Burkinabè footballer
Blandine Yaméogo, Burkinabè actress
Hamidou Yaméogo, Burkinabè cyclist
Hermann Yaméogo, Burkinabè politician
Herve Yaméogo, Burkinabè basketball player
Jacques Yaméogo, Burkinabè football manager
Maurice Yaméogo, former President of Burkina Faso from 1960 to 1966
Narcisse Yaméogo, Burkinabè footballer
Saint Pierre Yaméogo, Burkinabè film director
Salvador Yaméogo, Burkinabè politician
Moussa Yedan, Burkinabè footballer
Rene Jacob Yougbara, Burkinabè swimmer
Alexandre Yougbare, Burkinabè sprinter
Anne Zagré, Belgian sprinter
Arthur Zagré, Burkinabè footballer
Pingrénoma Zagré, Burkinabè military chief of staff
Hugues Fabrice Zango, Burkinabè athlete 
Mamadou Zaré, Ivorian football manager
Zêdess, Burkinabè musician
Yacouba Isaac Zida, Burkinabè military officer
Djibril Zidnaba, Burkinabè footballer
Ernest Zongo, Burkinabè cyclist
Henri Zongo, Burkinabè politician
Jonathan Zongo, Burkinabè footballer
Mamadou Zongo, Burkinabè footballer
Moïse Zongo, Burkinabè footballer
Norbert Zongo, Burkinabè journalist
Tertius Zongo, former Prime Minister of Burkina Faso
Paul Zoungrana, Burkinabè cardinal
 Roméo Boni
 Trova Boni
 Wilfried Balima
 Abdoul Yoda
 Abdoul Guiebre
 Hervé Koffi
 Karim Yoda
 Nasser Djiga
 Oumarou Nébié

See also 
 Mossi Kingdoms
 Mooré language

References

External links
 Detailed descriptions of Mossi masks (archived)
 Ouagadougu masks (archived)

Further reading
 Roy, Christopher D. Art of the Upper Volta Rivers. Meudon: Chaffin, 1987 
 Roy, Christopher D. Land of the Flying Masks. Munich: Prestel, 2007.

 
West African people
Ethnic groups in Burkina Faso
Ethnic groups in Ivory Coast
Ethnic groups in Ghana
Countries in precolonial Africa
French West Africa